Go Power! is a live album by saxophonist Illinois Jacquet recorded in Massachusetts in 1966 and released on the Cadet label.

Reception

Allmusic awarded the album 3 stars stating "Buckner's heavy organ sound takes a bit of getting used to (this set would have been much better if he had been on piano) but he does push Jacquet to some fiery playing".

Track listing 
All compositions by Illinois Jacquet except as indicated
 "On a Clear Day (You Can See Forever)" (Burton Lane, Alan Jay Lerner) - 7:54 
 "Illinois Jacquet Flies Again" - 6:52
 "Robbins' Nest" (Illinois Jacquet, Sir Charles Thompson) - 5:00   
 "Watermelon Man" (Herbie Hancock) - 5:42 
 "I Want a Little Girl" (Murray Mencher, Billy Moll) - 6:09 
 "Pamela's Blues" - 5:06  
 "Jan" (Norman Simmons) - 5:15

Personnel 
Illinois Jacquet - tenor saxophone
Milt Buckner - organ
Alan Dawson - drums

References 

1966 live albums
Cadet Records live albums
Illinois Jacquet live albums
Albums produced by Esmond Edwards